Mount Tom is a large and prominent peak near the city of Bishop in Inyo County of eastern California. It is in the Sierra Nevada and east of the Sierra Crest. The mountain is also in the John Muir Wilderness.

Along with its neighbor to the south, Basin Mountain, it dominates the western skyline from the upper Owens Valley.

History
The first name given to the mountain is Winuba, meaning "Standing Tall" in Owens Valley Paiute (Nüümü). The mountain is currently named for Thomas Clark, a resident of the pioneer town of Owensville, who is credited with being the first white settler to ascend the peak in the 1860s.  Mount Tom and Mount Morgan were part of the Pine Creek mining operation which was important producer of tungsten for much of the 20th century although the scheelite ore deposits are now largely depleted and mines have closed.

Climbing
The Owens Valley, at the base of Mt. Tom, is a little over 4,000 feet, and the summit of Mt. Tom is 13,658, for almost 10,000 feet of relief. The common routes up Mount Tom are not technically difficult, most are class 2–3, but they are all strenuous and long. Summiting Mount Tom is possible in a single day, but should only be attempted by those in very good physical condition.

Horton Creek Canyon is a common out and back hiking route and 14 mile out and back trail with 5,652 feet of elevation gain. The trailhead at Horton Creek Canyon is 8000 feet in elevation, it is 3.6 miles hike with about 2000 feet of elevation gain to reach Horton Lake.  There campers may, with an overnight wilderness permit, choose to spend the night. From Horton Lake hikers head up the southern ridge of Mount Tom to the summit with 1,750 feet of off trail class 2 scrambling.

There are multiple technical climbing routes on Mount Tom including:
 East Face Chimney Route, class IV, 5.9, First Ascent on August 18, 1988, by Galen Rowell and Kevin Worral.
 Golden Thread Arete, class IV, 5.9, First Ascent on September 5, 1999, by Stuart Polack and Walt Vennum. This is a 14 pitch route on the north face of Mount Tom.

Skiing 
Mount Tom is a popular back-country ski descent in the Spring years when there is enough snow. Elderberry canyon is the most popular ski descent. It is 7000 vertical feet of skiing and is steeper towards to summit.

On March 26, 2005, five skiers in Elderberry Canyon on Mount Tom were caught in two separate avalanches caused by the same party.  One skier was injured, two skiers were buried and killed.

See also
 List of mountain peaks of California

References

External links

 

Mountains of Inyo County, California
Mountains of the John Muir Wilderness
Inyo National Forest
Owens Valley
Mount Tom
Mountains of Northern California